Brigadier General Aye Myint Kyu (born 21 December 1947) was the Minister of Culture of Myanmar (Burma) and a former deputy minister of Ministry of Hotels and Tourism. He successfully organized the 27th SEA Games opening and closing ceremony as the chairman of the Preparation Committee for the opening and closing ceremony of the 27th SEA Games and showed the Myanmar Culture to the world.

Biography
Aye Myint Kyu was born in Minhla, Bago Division, the son of Thi Han and Kyi Kyi. His wife is Khin Swe Myint. He received a Bachelor of Science degree from Defence Services Academy in 1968.

References

1947 births
Burmese military personnel
Living people
Defence Services Academy alumni
Union Solidarity and Development Party politicians
Members of Pyithu Hluttaw
Burmese generals
Culture ministers of Myanmar
People from Bago Region